Glenneda Zuiderveld is an American politician serving as a member of the Idaho Senate for the 24th district. She assumed office on December 1, 2022.

Early life 
A native of Jerome, Idaho, Zuiderveld graduated from Jerome High School.

Career 
Outside of politics, Zuiderveld has worked in the agriculture industry for over 30 years. She was elected to the Idaho Senate in November 2022 and assumed office on December 1, 2022. She also serves as vice chair of the Senate Health & Welfare Committee.

References 

Living people
Idaho Republicans
Idaho state senators
Women state legislators in Idaho
People from Jerome, Idaho
People from Twin Falls, Idaho
People from Twin Falls County, Idaho
People from Jerome County, Idaho
Year of birth missing (living people)